Eight Cousins, or The Aunt-Hill was published in 1875 by American novelist Louisa May Alcott. It is the story of Rose Campbell, a lonely and sickly girl who has been recently orphaned and must now reside with her maiden great aunts (yet having a guardian), who are the matriarchs of her wealthy Boston family. When Rose's guardian, Uncle Alec, returns from abroad, he takes over her care. Through his unorthodox theories about child-rearing, she becomes happier and healthier while finding her place in her family of seven boy cousins and numerous aunts and uncles. She also makes friends with Phebe, her aunts' young housemaid, whose cheerful attitude in the face of poverty helps Rose to understand and value her own good fortune.

Major themes 
Each chapter describes an adventure in Rose's life as she learns to help herself and others make good choices. Rose must define for herself her role as the only woman of her generation in her family and as an heiress in Boston's elite society.

Motherless for most of her life, 13-year-old Rose looks to her many aunts, her friends, and the housemaid Phebe as feminine role models. At the same time, she is suddenly confronted with a male guardian and seven male cousins, none of whom she knows well, after losing her beloved father, the only man in her life.

Like all of Alcott's books for young people, the story takes a high moral tone. Various chapters illustrate the evils of cigar-smoking, "yellow-back" novels, high fashion, billiards, and patent nostrums, while promoting exercise, a healthy diet, and wholesome experiences of many kinds for girls as well as boys. Alcott uses the novel to promote education theories and feminist ideas, many of which appear in her other books. For example, in choosing Rose's wardrobe, Uncle Alec rejects current women's fashions (such as corsets, high heels, veils, and bustles) in favor of less restrictive, healthier clothing. Although he discourages her from the professional study of medicine, he educates her in physiology, a subject her aunts consider inappropriate for girls, so she can understand and take charge of her own health. Rose is prepared for a career as a wife and mother, yet is taught that she must take active, thoughtful control of her fortune so she can use it and social position to the best advantage of the larger community. Written in an age when few women had control of their own money, property, or destinies, Alcott's portrayal of Rose's upbringing is a good deal more revolutionary than 21st-century readers may realize.

The sequel to Eight Cousins is Rose in Bloom (1876), which continues Rose's story into young adulthood, depicting courtship and marriage, poverty and charity, transcendental poetry and prose, and illness and death among her family and friends.

Characters 

Rose Campbell: The central character of the novel is the daughter of the recently deceased George Campbell, one of six Campbell brothers who are nephews of Aunts Plenty and Peace Campbell. She is heiress to his considerable fortune. (The Campbells, wealthy residents of Boston, are of Scottish descent, and some of them are engaged in the China trade.) Rose, 13 1/2 at the beginning of the novel, is a pretty and sweet-natured child without marked talents of any kind. She has never known her mother and has lived apart from the rest of the Campbell family all her life. As the story opens, she is mourning the death of her father and awaiting with apprehension the arrival of her unknown guardian, Alec Campbell. She speaks French fairly well, and is slightly vain (as becomes apparent when her uncle wishes her to refrain from the wearing of tight belts around her waist).

The aunts of the “Aunt-hill”

 Plenty Campbell: Maiden great-aunt of Rose and matriarch of the family. Aunt Plenty is chatelaine of the ancestral home in Boston, which is “a capital old mansion … full of all manner of odd nooks, charming rooms, and mysterious passages. Windows broke out in unexpected places, little balconies overhung the garden most romantically, and there was a long upper hall full of curiosities from all parts of the world … “
 Peace Campbell: Maiden sister of Plenty. An invalid, she has a tragic history. Her lover died hours before their wedding, and “gentle Peace” never recovered from the blow. Universally beloved by the family, she is the Mary to Aunt Plenty's Martha.
 Myra Campbell: She is a widow and we never learn her husband's name.  Myra is a gloomy, self-absorbed hypochondriac, obsessed with medicines and mortality. Her presence is tolerated rather than welcomed by the rest of the family. She is the mother of the only other female Campbell cousin, Caroline, who died young – possibly “dosed to death” – inadvertently poisoned with "quack medicines" by her mother.
 Jane Humphries Campbell: Wife of Uncle Mac and mother of Rose's cousins Mac and Steve. Aunt Jane is a stern disciplinarian, utterly lacking a sense of humor. But she is completely reliable. Her bark is worse than her bite, and Rose comes to like and trust her.
 Clara Campbell: Wife of Uncle Stephen, who is absent in India. Clara is a social butterfly, completely absorbed in Boston's high society. She looks forward to sponsoring Rose's debut in a few years’ time and secretly plans that Rose shall marry her son Charlie.
 Jessie Campbell: Wife of Uncle Jem, a sea captain. Jessie has raised four sons – Archie, Will, Geordie, Jamie – almost without the assistance of her husband, who is always away at sea. Steady, wise, and loving, Jessie is Rose's favorite aunt and the nearest substitute she has to a mother. Jessie is the aunt most trusted by Rose's guardian, Uncle Alec.

The Campbell brothers, uncles of Rose and nephews of Aunts Peace and Plenty

 Alec: The principal male character. A seafaring doctor, he became Rose's guardian when her father George died. He has never married; we are led to assume that the great love of his life was Rose's mother, who chose to marry George. Alec has “advanced” ideas about child-rearing, which he implements in so gentle and loving a fashion that Rose is restored to health and happiness in spite of her fears. The aunts are nervous about (or even opposed to) some of Alec's ideas, but they come to trust him implicitly.
 Mac: Married to Jane and father to Rose's cousins Mac and Steve. He is engaged in the China trade and has a warehouse on the Bay full of Asian treasures. A trifle henpecked by his masterful wife, he spends most of his time in his counting-house. He is very fond of Rose and secretly hopes that she will marry one of his sons.
 Jem (James): Married to Jessie and father to Rose's cousins Archie, Will, Geordie, and Jamie. Jem is a sea captain who makes a surprise appearance toward the end of the book.
 Stephen: Married to Clara and father to Rose's cousin Charlie. His profession is never specified. He lives in India, perhaps driven from home by his distaste for Clara's propensity for high society. Stephen never makes an appearance in Eight Cousins.
 George: Recently deceased father of Rose, for whom she grieves deeply. Uncle Alec and he "fell out" because they loved the same woman. Years later they met and made up, and George asked Alec to look after Rose if anything happened to him.

A sixth brother-in-law, Aunt Myra's deceased husband, is never named.

The Campbell cousins, in order of age

 Archibald (Archie): Eldest son of Jem and Jessie. Eldest of all the cousins at age 16, of steady and thoughtful character, he is the Chief, much respected by all the boys and an “older brother” figure to Rose.
 Charles C. (Charlie): Also known as Prince Charlie, the “flower of the family,” considered the most handsome, talented, and promising of the lot. Age 16. He is the spoiled only child of Stephen and Clara—spoiled by his too-indulgent mother, with no father present to give him guidance. Charlie and Archie are inseparable friends and lead the way in all exploits.
 Alexander Mackenzie (Mac): Elder son of Mac and Jane. Age 15. Known as the Bookworm, or simply “the Worm,” Mac always has his nose in a book and is regarded as the wisest and most learned of the cousins, although deficient in basic social skills through absent-mindedness and lack of interest.
 Stephen (Steve): Mac's younger brother. Age 14. A good-natured though rather conceited dandy, he idolizes Charlie and copies him in everything, not always to his own advantage.
 William (Will): Jem and Jessie's second son. Age 12.
 George  (Geordie): Jem and Jessie's third son. Age 11.
 James (Jamie): Jem and Jessie's youngest. Age 6. Much-loved but unspoiled.

Other characters

 Phebe Moore: Housemaid of Aunts Plenty and Peace, a girl from the poor house, who is employed on trial at the opening of the story. Lonely Rose befriends Phebe and then “adopts” her as a sister, teaches her improvements in reading and writing skills, admires Phebe's marked musical talent and upright character, and includes her in all aspects of her life as Phebe becomes her personal maid. (At a time in our social history when it was unusual for members of a wealthy household to develop close personal relationships with “the help,” this is a testament to the sweetness of Rose's unspoiled character.)
 Dolly: Bad-tempered but good-hearted cook in Aunt Plenty's household.
 Annabelle Bliss: Friend of Rose. She is “the model child of the neighborhood,” daughter of a prominent Boston family whom the aunts consider suitable for Rose to know; however Rose can't bear her. Alcott frequently satirized fashionable, empty-headed girls in her novels.
 Mother Atkinson: Kindly doyenne of the wholesome mountain household (location unspecified, but probably in Maine or New Hampshire), known as Cosey Corner, where Rose and various family members spend several memorable summers.
 Fun See: A Chinese boy who has come to America to be educated in a western school.
  Whang Lo: An elderly Chinese merchant who does business with Uncle Mac Campbell; he wears Western dress and speaks good English.

The Alcotts themselves would summer in a location called "Happy Corner" in Walpole, New Hampshire, but the description of "Cosy Corner" places it within walking distance of Mount Washington, very likely in Intervale. In the 19th century, New Englanders who could afford it went to the mountains or the seashore for the fresher, cooler air considered sovereign for physical and mental complaints.

External links 
 
 PDF Scan of Eight Cousins
 
 Louisa May Alcott Official Website

1875 American novels
Novels by Louisa May Alcott
Novels about orphans